Mary Kostka Kirby (9 July 1863–18 August 1952) was a New Zealand catholic nun. She was born in Limerick, County Limerick, Ireland on 9 July 1863.

References

1863 births
1952 deaths
20th-century New Zealand Roman Catholic nuns
People from Limerick (city)
Irish emigrants to New Zealand (before 1923)
19th-century Irish nuns